St. Mary of the Seven Sorrows Church (commonly St. Mary's Catholic Church and formerly the Cathedral of the Blessed Virgin of the Seven Sorrows) is an historic Catholic parish in downtown Nashville, Tennessee, United States. Its church on the corner of Charlotte Avenue and 5th Avenue in Nashville, Tennessee, built in 1845, it is the oldest extant church in Nashville and the oldest Catholic church in what is now the Diocese of Nashville. St. Mary replaced the diocese's first church, Holy Rosary, which had been erected previously on the site today occupied by the Tennessee State Capitol.

The church was designed by Adolphus Heiman (1809–1862), who also designed a number of other notable Nashville buildings, including the State Asylum and the Italianate-style Belmont Mansion. The late antebellum Greek Revival structure features a gabled front entrance of two fluted Ionic order columns supporting a classical pediment. The cornerstone was laid in 1844, not long after the erection of the diocese in 1837; construction was delayed, however, by lack of funds. It was dedicated on October 31, 1847. Richard Pius Miles, the first Bishop of Nashville, was the driving force behind its construction, and he is now buried there.

St. Mary's remained the cathedral until 1914, when the episcopal see was moved to the  Cathedral of the Incarnation.

The church was added to the National Register of Historic Places in 1970.

See also
List of Catholic cathedrals in the United States
List of cathedrals in the United States

References

19th-century Roman Catholic church buildings in the United States
1844 establishments in Tennessee
Roman Catholic churches completed in 1845
Roman Catholic churches in Nashville, Tennessee
Churches on the National Register of Historic Places in Tennessee
Religious organizations established in 1844
Roman Catholic churches in Tennessee
National Register of Historic Places in Nashville, Tennessee
Roman Catholic cathedrals in Tennessee